City of New York was a British built passenger liner of the Inman Line that was designed to be the largest and fastest liner on the Atlantic.  When she entered service in August 1888, she was the first twin screw express liner and while she did not achieve the westbound Blue Riband, she ultimately held the eastbound record from August 1892 to May 1893 at a speed of 20.11 knots.  City of New York and her sister City of Paris are considered especially beautiful ships and throughout their careers were rivals to the White Star Teutonic and Majestic.  In February 1893, the Inman Line was merged into the American Line and by act of Congress, the renamed New York was transferred to the US flag.  Beginning in the mid-1890s, New York and Paris were paired with St Louis and St Paul to form one of the premier Atlantic services.  New York continued with the American Line until 1920 and was broken for scrap in 1923.  She served the US Navy as Harvard during the Spanish–American War and Plattsburg in World War I.  She is also remembered for nearly colliding with the RMS Titanic as the latter ship began her doomed maiden voyage in 1912.

Development and design
When International Navigation Company purchased the Inman Line in 1886, the fleet needed new units to revive the line's fortunes against the Cunard Line and White Star.  International Navigation's vice president, Clement Griscom, immediately sailed to Liverpool with a commitment from the Pennsylvania Railroad to provide $2 million in capital towards the building of a new ship.  Shipbuilders in Scotland were experiencing a recession at the time and offered to deliver two ships at $1,850,000 per unit.  The Pennsylvania Railroad agreed to underwrite the additional capital and the contracts were signed for City of New York and her sister, City of Paris.

When designing the new liners, the lessons of the City of Rome fiasco were recalled.  The original design called two ships of  that were only slightly bigger than City of Rome, but with steel hulls and twin screws.  Because powerful single screw liners were prone to shaft failure, they carried extensive rigging for sails.  Twin screws rendered this extra rigging unnecessary.   Starting in 1866, a few twin screw ships sailed the Atlantic, but the new Inman ships were the first twin screw express liners.

City of New York even had a figurehead of a female figure carved by sculptor James Allan. To address the vibration problems of most liners of the period, the new Inman liners were given a ratio of length to beam of 8.3 to 1 as compared to the then common ratio of 10 to 1. The hull was more extensively subdivided than previously attempted. The ships were equipped with a full double bottom and 15 transverse bulkheads that reached the saloon deck. They also received a fore-aft bulkhead over their entire length. Each ship had two triple expansion engines, of 9,000 indicated horsepower each that were placed in separate compartments. While the engines for the sisters were identical, City of Paris produced 1,500 more horsepower than City of New York.

City of New York was designed for 540 first, 200 second and 1,000 steerage passengers. Her quarters were fitted with running hot and cold water, electric ventilation, and electric lighting. Her first class public rooms, such as library and smoking room, were fitted with walnut panels and her dining salon came with a massive dome that provided a natural light to the passengers.

Service history
On March 15, 1888, City of New York was christened by Lady Randolph Churchill.  On August 1, she commenced her maiden voyage from Liverpool to New York City where she arrived on August 10. Among the prominent passengers on board for her first crossing was noted American politician and statesman James G. Blaine. Unfortunately, while achieving respectable crossings, she was unable to produce records.  Her sister, City of Paris entered service in April 1889 and took the westbound Blue Riband a month later.  That August, White Star commissioned the twin screw Teutonic followed the next year by Majestic and the Inman and White Star pairs took turns bettering each other's times.  While City of Paris proved to be the fastest of the four, in 1892 City of New York was finally able to outrun her sister for the eastbound record.

On August 21, 1890, the big steamship liner Teutonic and the City of New York raced from the New York pier to the Sandy Hook bar out to the bay. Hundreds of people were present to observe the famous liners as they departed. The pilot on the Teutonic was Captain Joseph Henderson, the pilot on the City of New York was Peter McEnneny. After seeing the vessels safely outside the bay, the pilots were taken off by Pilot boat Lillie, No. 8. Pilot Henderson said the Teutonic crossed the bar at 9:42 AM. Pilot Peter McEnenerny said the City of New York crossed at 10:20 AM. The Teutonic went at the rate of 17 knots. It was expected that the vessels would be in sight of each other for 2–3 days. 

It had been International Navigation's plan to maintain Inman's status as a British flag carrier.  However, even before City of New York was completed, the British Government responded to Inman's ownership change by revoking the line's mail contract. International Navigation lobbied the US Congress to replace the subsidy and allow the Inman speedsters to register in the US despite the law that only permitted US-built ships to be registered there.  After considerable controversy, Congress enacted the subsidy provided that International Navigation build two similar ships in the US and all four twin-screw liners being available to the government in the event of a crisis.  In one of his last acts in office, on February 22, 1893, President Benjamin Harrison boarded the now renamed New York during a snowstorm and raised the American Flag.  The Inman Line was merged into International Navigation's American Line.  As a part of the change, the former Inman liners now used Southampton as their UK destination rather than Liverpool, ending their direct rivalry with the White Star pair until 1907 when Teutonic and Majestic were also transferred to Southampton.

Spanish–American War

At the outbreak of the Spanish–American War, City of New York was chartered as an auxiliary cruiser with a civilian crew, commissioning on 26 April 1898 at New York, Captain C. S. Cotton in command and renamed Harvard. Assigned as a scout, Harvard departed New York on 30 April to cruise West Indian waters in search of the Spanish fleet.  After sending back several reports on the location of Spanish units in the Caribbean, Harvard was blockaded by a larger force at Saint-Pierre, Martinique from 11–17 May, after which she proceeded to Santiago de Cuba and St. Nicholas Mole, Haiti, with dispatches from Commodore Winfield Scott Schley.  Interrupting her scouting duties, Harvard returned to Newport News, Virginia, 7–26 June during which time her crew was officially taken into the Naval Service.

Harvard returned to the Caribbean with troops and supplies, arriving at Altares, Cuba, about 1 July. After Rear Admiral William T. Sampson's victory at the victory off Santiago, she rescued survivors. Despite the high surf and ammunition explosions from the stricken Spanish ships, Harvard succeeded in recovering over 600 officers and men.

On 4 July 1898, the 9th Massachusetts Volunteer Infantry were guarding the prisoners of war inside Harvard. A guard ordered a prisoner, who was attempting to cross the line, to return. The prisoner did not understand English and the guard fired a shot causing other prisoners to stand up. Fearing the prisoners were about to attack, the guards opened fire, killing six prisoners and wounding thirteen more. After the investigation, it was concluded that it was a mistake. The tragedy was known as "Harvard Incident".

No longer needed as a scout in the Caribbean, Harvard was sent back to the United States 10 July 1898. She was temporarily turned over to the War Department, and returned to Santiago de Cuba to transport troops back to the United States.  Harvard arrived at New York on 27 August and decommissioned 2 September 1898 at New York Navy Yard.

In 1901 she underwent a rebuild and was fitted with triple expansion engines, her funnels reduced from three to two, and her size increased to 10,798 tons.

Post-war

New York resumed her civilian service on the New York–Southampton run in January 1899. During her first post-war crossing, one of her engines broke down and she had to return to Southampton for repairs lasting three months. Three years later, New York was taken out of service for an extensive refit that included replacing her machinery with quadruple expansion engines. Her good looks were partly spoiled when her three raked funnels were replaced with two taller ones. She resumed service on 14 April 1903.

On 10 April 1912, New York was berthed in Southampton beside . The three-inch steel hawsers that secured her were torn from their moorings when the much larger Titanic (leaving port to begin her ill-fated maiden voyage to New York City) passed by, creating a suction effect. A collision was narrowly avoided when Titanic's captain, Edward Smith, ordered the port propeller to reverse, turning the larger liner while the nearby tugboat Vulcan towed New York in the opposite direction.

In 1913, New York was re-configured as a second and third-class only liner. At the beginning of the first world war, the American Line reverted to Liverpool for their UK terminal. As a neutral flagged liner, New York was very profitable until the United States entered the war. The US Navy commissioned her as a troop transport renamed the Plattsburg. During her service, she was damaged by a mine in the Mersey.

After the war, New York's reconditioning included removal of a mast. She resumed her passenger service in 1920 and remained with the American Line for nine months until she was sold to the Polish Navigation Company. After one voyage, her new owner went bankrupt and New York was seized by the creditors who sold her to the Irish American Line in 1922. She was then sold to the United Transatlantic Line and again to the American Black Sea Line. Her last Atlantic crossing was on 10 June 1922 from New York to Naples and Constantinople. Later that year, she was sold for scrap.

Gallery

References

External links

MaritimeQuest - SS New York
TheGreatOceanLiners.com - City of New York/New York
Ocean Steamships; A popular account of their construction, development, management and appliances
Several interior images of the City of New York

Ships built on the River Clyde
Ocean liners
RMS Titanic
Steamships of the United Kingdom
Steamships of the United States
Blue Riband holders
1888 ships